Hydroxylamine dehydrogenase (HAO (ambiguous)) is an enzyme with systematic name hydroxylamine:ferricytochrome-c oxidoreductase. This enzyme catalyses the following chemical reaction

 (1) hydroxylamine + H2O + 2 ferricytochrome c  nitrite + 2 ferrocytochrome c + 5 H+
 (2) hydroxylamine + ferricytochrome c  nitric oxide + ferrocytochrome c + 3 H+

The enzymes from the nitrifying bacterium Nitrosomonas europaea and the methylotrophic bacterium Methylococcus capsulatus are hemoproteins.

References

External links 
 

EC 1.7.2